Julia Louise Bogany (July 16, 1948 – March 28, 2021) was an American community leader. She was a Tongva elder, educator, and cultural consultant.

Early life 
Bogany was born in Santa Monica, California.

Career 
Bogany taught preschool for 35 years. From 2000 to 2021, Bogany was cultural affairs officer of the Gabrieleño-Tongva San Gabriel Band of Mission Indians. She taught Tongva language, beading, and basket-weaving classes, and conducted cultural workshops throughout southern California. She worked on fetal alcohol spectrum disorder awareness in Native American communities. She was founding president of Kuruvungna Sacred Springs, president of Residential Motivators, and vice-president of Keepers of Indigenous Ways, all non-profit organizations. She was active in the Children Court L.A. Round Table, the Santa Monica Conservancy 21st Century Task Force, and the California Native American College Board. She was Elder in Residence at Pitzer College and Pomona College.

Bogany received the Heritage Award from the Aquarium of the Pacific in 2010. The National Indian Child Welfare Association named her Champion for Native Children in 2019. Los Angeles City/County Native American Indian Commission recognized her with the Spirit of Tradition Award in 2020. In 2021, she received the California Missions Foundation's Chairman's Award. 

Bogany wrote a children's book, Tongva Women Inspiring the Future, and contributed to the compilation of a Tongva dictionary. At California State University Dominguez Hills, there is a mural depicting Bogany under an oak tree, by artist iris yirei hu. Bogany was also featured on a billboard as part of artist Erin Yoshi's  "Land of We" installation, and is depicted with her great-granddaughters in a mural by Audrey Chan, at the Little Tokyo/Arts District metro station in Los Angeles.

Personal life 
She had four children. When her children were grown, she married Andrew Bogany. Bogany died in 2021, after a stroke; she was 72 years old.

References

External links 

 "Community Conversations: Tongva representation in public art", a 2019 audio presentation featuring Julia Bogany, posted by Metro Los Angeles to YouTube
 "Indigenous L.A.: Cultural Revitalization" (2020), a short video featuring Julia Bogany, posted to YouTube for Native American Heritage Month, by the Natural History Museum of Los Angeles County
 The Little Tokyo/Arts District station mural by Audrey Chan, from the artist's Instagram
 Julia Bogany, Megan Dorame, iris yirei hu, Pakook koy Peshaax (The Sun Enters the Earth and Leaves the Earth), Institute of Contemporary Art Los Angeles (ICALA); an installation in memory of Bogany, at Los Angeles State Historic Park

1948 births
2021 deaths
Tongva
People from Santa Monica, California
Native American women